The Apostle is a 1997 American drama film written and directed by Robert Duvall, who stars in the title role. John Beasley, Farrah Fawcett, Walton Goggins, Billy Bob Thornton, June Carter Cash, Miranda Richardson, and Billy Joe Shaver also appear. It was filmed on location in and around Saint Martinville and Des Allemands, Louisiana with some establishing shots done in the Dallas, Texas area. The majority of the film was shot in the Louisiana areas of Sunset and Lafayette.

The film was screened in the Un Certain Regard section at the 1998 Cannes Film Festival. For his performance, Duvall was nominated for the Academy Award for Best Actor. The film won the Independent Spirit Award for Best Film for 1997.

Plot 
Euliss F. "Sonny" Dewey is a charismatic Pentecostal preacher. His wife Jessie has begun an adulterous relationship with a youth minister named Horace. She refuses Sonny's desire to reconcile, although she assures him that she will not interfere with his right to see his children. She has also conspired to use their church's bylaws to have him removed from power. Sonny asks God what to do but receives no answer. Much of the congregation sides with Jessie in this dispute. Sonny, however, refuses to start a new church, insisting that the one which forced him out was "his" church. At his child's Little League game, Sonny, in an emotional and drunken fit, attacks Horace with a bat and puts him into a coma; Horace later dies.

A fleeing Sonny ditches his car in a river and gets rid of all identifying information. After destroying all evidence of his past, Sonny rebaptizes himself and anoints himself as "The Apostle E. F." He leaves Texas and ends up in the bayous of Louisiana, where he persuades a retired minister named Blackwell to help him start a new church. He works various odd jobs and uses the money to build the church, and to buy time to preach on a local radio station. Sonny also begins dating the station's receptionist.

With Sonny's energy and charisma, the church soon has a faithful and racially integrated flock. Sonny even succeeds in converting a racist construction worker who shows up at a church picnic intent on destruction. While at work in a local diner, Sonny sees his new girlfriend out in public with her husband and children, apparently reconciled. Sonny walks out, vowing never to return there.

Jessie hears a radio broadcast of the Apostle E. F. and calls the police on Sonny. The police show up in the middle of an evening service but allow Sonny to finish it while they wait outside. In the poignant finale, Sonny delivers an impassioned sermon before telling his flock that he has to go. In the final scene, Sonny, now part of a chain gang, preaches to the inmates as they work along the side of a highway.

Cast

Production

Development
Making The Apostle had been a longtime passion project for Robert Duvall, who first wrote the script in the 1984 but could not find a studio willing to produce it. Duvall's interest in playing a preacher stemmed from an experience he had in the 1960s visiting a small Pentecostal chapel in Arkansas while doing research for an off-Broadway play. Said Duvall, "There was a certain simplicity and understanding. And also the feeling of the folklore. Preaching is one of the great American art forms. The rhythm, the cadence. And nobody knows about it except the preachers themselves." After finding no interest from studios, he eventually decided to direct and finance the film himself.

Filming
The film was primarily shot in western Louisiana over a period seven weeks in the fall of 1996. The fictional town of Bayou Boutte is actually a small town in Louisiana called Sunset. Some members of the supporting cast were actual churchgoers from the area.

Release
The film was first screened at the Toronto International Film Festival on September 6, 1997. In the middle of the screening, studio executives began leaving the theater to bid for distribution rights. October Films won the bidding war and gained the distribution rights that night. 

The Apostle opened in limited release in North American theaters on December 19, 1997, eventually expanding nationwide through February and March 1998. It went on to gross $21.3 million worldwide, against a production budget of $5 million.

Soundtrack 

The score for The Apostle was scored by David Mansfield. Three songs, by country music artists Lyle Lovett, Patty Loveless, and contemporary Christian artist Steven Curtis Chapman, were recorded especially for the film. The song "There Ain't No Grave Gonna Hold My Body Down" was composed by Brother Claude Ely. 

The soundtrack won the 1998 Grammy Award for Best Southern, Country, or Bluegrass Gospel Album.

The songs, "I Will Not Go Quietly" by Chapman, "Two Coats" by Loveless and "I'm a Soldier in the Army of the Lord" by Lovett were released on a soundtrack album that was supplemented with more exclusive songs "inspired by" (but not included in) the film.

Track listing

Chart performance

Reception 
The film has an 88% approval rating on the review aggregator Rotten Tomatoes, based on 50 reviews, with an average score of 8/10.  

Critic Roger Ebert gave it four out of four stars and called the film "a lesson in how movies can escape from convention and penetrate the hearts of rare characters." Lisa Schwarzbaum of Entertainment Weekly gave the film an A- grade and described it as "a seamless match of strong artistic vision and physical performance", with "the Oscar-winning star of Tender Mercies [drawing] on more than three decades of experience personifying the hard contours and bruised souls of American men to create a fearless and fascinating piece of work."

American theologian Harvey Cox said, "It's the most explicit treatment of evangelical religious sensibility I've seen. One is stunned by Duvall's performance. But beyond that, it is a film about sin and redemption, something Dostoevskian, deeply theological, not churchy. It's in-your-face theology." The Christian Science Monitor noted how the film dealt with the subject of race as it "presents the Christian message as universal, extending to all races and classes."

Awards and nominations
The Apostle garnered numerous awards and nominations from major awards organizations. At the 70th Academy Awards, Duvall was nominated for Best Actor. The film won the awards for Best Film, Best Male Lead, and Best Director at the 13th Independent Spirit Awards. Miranda Richardson and Farrah Fawcett were also both nominated for Best Supporting Female at the Independent Spirit Awards.

In addition, Duvall won the awards for Best Actor from the Chicago Film Critics Association, Florida Film Critics, Las Vegas Film Critics Society, Los Angeles Film Critics Association, New York Film Critics Circle, the National Society of Film Critics, Society of Texas Film Critics, and the Satellite Awards. Duvall was nominated for a Screen Actors Guild Award for Best Actor and an Un Certain Regard Award at the 1998 Cannes Film Festival.

References

External links 
 
 
 The Apostle at Arts & Faith Top 100 Spiritually Significant Films

1990s American films
1990s English-language films
1997 drama films
1997 films
1997 independent films
Adultery in films
American drama films
Country music films
Films about Christianity
Films directed by Robert Duvall
Films scored by David Mansfield
Films set in Louisiana
Films set in Texas
Films shot in Louisiana
Films shot in Texas
Independent Spirit Award for Best Film winners